The 2018–19 UEFA Nations League B was the second division of the 2018–19 edition of the UEFA Nations League, the inaugural season of the international football competition involving the men's national teams of the 55 member associations of UEFA.

Format
League B consisted of 12 UEFA members ranked from 13 to 24, split into four groups of three. The winners of each group were promoted to the 2020–21 UEFA Nations League A. The third-placed team of each group was initially to be relegated to the 2020–21 UEFA Nations League C, but remained in League B following UEFA's reformatting of the next edition's groups.

In addition, League B was allocated one of the four remaining UEFA Euro 2020 places. Four teams from League B which had not already qualified for the European Championship finals competed in the play-offs for each division, which were played in October and November 2020. The play-off berths were first allocated to the group winners, and if any of the group winners had already qualified for the European Championship finals, then to the next best ranked team of the division, etc. If there were fewer than four teams in League B which had not already qualified for the European Championship finals, the play-off berths would be allocated via one of two methods. If League B had a group winner selected for the play-offs, the next best team in the overall ranking from a lower league would be selected. If League B had no group winner available, the best team in the overall ranking would be selected. The play-offs consisted of two "one-off" semi-finals (best-ranked team vs. fourth best-ranked team and second best-ranked team vs. third best-ranked team, played at home of higher-ranked teams) and one "one-off" final between the two semi-final winners (venue drawn in advance between semi-final 1 and 2).

Seeding
Teams were allocated to League B according to their UEFA national team coefficients after the conclusion of the 2018 FIFA World Cup qualifying group stage on 11 October 2017. Teams were split into three pots of four teams, ordered based on their UEFA national team coefficient. The seeding pots for the draw were announced on 7 December 2017.

The group draw took place at the SwissTech Convention Center in Lausanne, Switzerland on 24 January 2018, 12:00 CET. For political reasons, Russia and Ukraine could not be drawn into the same group (due to the Russian military intervention in Ukraine).

Groups
The fixture list was confirmed by UEFA on 24 January 2018 following the draw.

Times are CET/CEST, as listed by UEFA (local times, if different, are in parentheses).

Group 1

Group 2

Group 3

Group 4

Goalscorers

Overall ranking
The 12 League B teams were ranked 13th to 24th overall in the 2018–19 UEFA Nations League according to the following rules:
The teams finishing first in the groups were ranked 13th to 16th according to the results of the league phase.
The teams finishing second in the groups were ranked 17th to 20th according to the results of the league phase.
The teams finishing third in the groups were ranked 21st to 24th according to the results of the league phase.

Prize money
The prize money to be distributed was announced in March 2018. Each team in League B received a solidarity fee of €1 million. In addition, the four group winners received double this amount with a €1M bonus fee. This meant that the maximum amount of solidarity and bonus fees for a team from League B was €2M.

Euro 2020 qualifying play-offs

The four best teams in League B according to the overall ranking that did not qualify for UEFA Euro 2020 through the qualifying group stage competed in the play-offs, with the winners qualifying for the final tournament. If there had been fewer than four teams in League B that had not qualified, the remaining slots would have been allocated to teams from another league, according to the overall ranking.

Notes

References

External links

League B